Srebro iz modre špilje is a novel by Slovenian author Slavko Pregl. It was first published in 2003.

See also
List of Slovenian novels

References
Srebro iz modre špilje, Booksa.hr, accessed 19 July 2012

Slovenian novels
2003 novels